Black Lake is a lake in the municipality of Blind River, Algoma District in Northeastern Ontario, Canada. It is part of the Great Lakes Basin.

The primary outflow, at the south, is Black Creek, which flows to Lake Duborne, which in turn flows via the Blind River to the North Channel on Lake Huron.

See also
List of lakes of Ontario

References

Other map sources:

Lakes of Algoma District